Eugeniusz Juretzko (25 December 1939 – 16 January 2018) was a Roman Catholic bishop.

Juretzko was born in Poland and was ordained to the priesthood in 1964. He served as bishop of the Roman Catholic Diocese of Yokadouma, Cameroon, from 1991 until 2017.

Notes

1939 births
2018 deaths
21st-century Roman Catholic bishops in Cameroon
Polish Roman Catholic priests
20th-century Roman Catholic bishops in Cameroon
Roman Catholic bishops of Yokadouma